John Guthrie (10 September 1795 – 6 July 1865) was an English first-class cricketer who played for Cambridge University in two matches in 1819, totalling 32 runs with a highest score of 22.

Guthrie was educated at Westminster School and Trinity College, Cambridge. After graduating from Cambridge he became a Church of England priest and after other posts he was vicar of Calne, Wiltshire, from 1835 until his death. In Calne he and his wife founded a local school, the Guthrie School. He was appointed a canon of Bristol Cathedral in 1858 and was the first chairman of council of Clifton College, founded in 1862.

References

Bibliography
 

English cricketers
English cricketers of 1787 to 1825
Cambridge University cricketers
1795 births
1865 deaths
People educated at Westminster School, London
Alumni of Trinity College, Cambridge
19th-century English Anglican priests